I&M Bank Tanzania Limited is a commercial bank in Tanzania headquartered in Dar es Salaam and a subsidiary of Kenyan based I&M Bank Group. It is licensed by the Bank of Tanzania, the central bank and national banking regulator.

, the bank was a mid-sized financial institution, providing banking services to individuals and businesses, with emphasis on serving medium to large corporate clients. At that time, the bank's total assets were valued at approximately TSh 296.6 billion (US$175.5 million), with shareholders' equity estimated at TSh 29.4 billion (US$17.4 million).

History
The bank started operations in Tanzania in 2002 as CF Union Bank, with headquarters in Dar-es-Salaam. By 2010 it operated two branches in Dar-es-Salaam and a third branch in Arusha. In January that year, the shareholders of CF Union Bank sold the bank to a consortium headed by I&M Bank Group. Other investors in the consortium included PROPARCO, the French Development Agency, Kibo Fund, a private equity firm based in Mauritius and Michael Shirima, a Tanzanian businessman who is the  largest shareholder in Precision Air. In September 2010, the bank changed its name from CF Union Bank to I&M Bank (Tanzania) Limited, to reflect the new ownership.

Ownership
I&M Bank Tanzania Limited is owned by institutions and one private individuals as detailed in the table below:

Branch Network
As of November 2014, I&M Bank (Tanzania) Limited maintains the following networked branches:

 Main Branch - Indira Gandhi Street Next to Nida Textiles Mills, Dar es Salaam
 Moshi Branch - Rindi Lane Road, Moshi
 Oysterbay Branch - Toure Drive & Ghuba Road, 344 Block F, Oysterbay Area, Dar es Salaam
 Maktaba Branch - Maktaba Square, Maktaba Street, Dar es Salaam 
 Kariakoo Branch - Plot 21 Livingstone Street, Kariakoo, Dar es Salaam
 Arusha Branch - Sunda Plaza- Ground floor, Goliondoi Street, Arusha
 Nyerere Road Branch - PSSSF Plaza Building along Nyerere Road
 Mwanza Branch - Gradia Tower, Uhuru Street Mwanza.

See also
 I&M Bank Group
 I&M Bank Limited
 Bank One Mauritius
 List of banks in Tanzania

References

External links 
I&M Bank Acquires CF Union Bank
Why Bank Owners Need To Inject Cash Into Regional Units

Banks of Tanzania
Economy of Dar es Salaam
Banks established in 2002
2002 establishments in Tanzania
I&M Bank Group